A drill bit is a tool used in a drill to create circular holes.

Drill bit or Drillbit may also refer to:

 Chicago Spire, a former building nicknamed the "Drill Bit"
 Drill bit (well), drill bits used for oil wells, etc.

Fictional characters
 Drill bit, a character in the Transformers anime and toy series, sometimes accompanying Heavy Load, a member of the Build Team
 Drillbit, another character in the Transformers anime and toy series, an Autobot and personal attendant to Metroplex, leader of Gigantion
 Drillbit Taylor, the lead character in the 2008 comedy film of the same name

See also
 Dilbit, diluted bitumen, a petroleum product